Marikhali Bridge is a pair of parallel prestressed concrete girder bridges in Bangladesh. Below is the traffic on the bridge in 2004:

References

 

Road bridges in Bangladesh